soulDecision was a Canadian pop band active from 1993 to 2005. They are best known for the single, "Faded", which hit number-one in Canada in 2000, and "Ooh It's Kinda Crazy" which became a hit as well the following year in early 2001.

Career
The group was formed in Vancouver, British Columbia under the original name 'Indecision' by singer and multi-instrumentalist Trevor Guthrie, singer David Bowman, and keyboard player Ken Lewko, who were studying music together at Capilano College. Before signing a record deal, they released a couple of singles that received national top 40 radio airplay. The success of those singles led them to a record deal with Universal Music. However, due to a name conflict with an American band, they reluctantly changed their name from Indecision; they allowed their manager, Garry Francis, to choose the new name soulDecision. Launched at the height of the boy band era, they nonetheless wrote their own songs and played their own instruments. 
The group's first studio album, No One Does It Better, was recorded in Velvet Sound Studios in Sydney, Australia and released on February 22, 2000, in Canada. The album's lead single "Faded", an up-tempo pop tune mixed with R&B and featuring a rap sequence by Thrust, was a hit in Canada, reaching number one on the country's singles chart. It also reached number 22 in the United States. The follow-up single, "Ooh It's Kinda Crazy", also was a hit in North America, and at one time became the number one request on MTV's Total Request Live. In 2018, Billboard named the video as one of the top ten "Greatest Boy Band Videos of the TRL Era" beside hitmakers including Backstreet Boys, NSYNC, and 98 Degrees. No One Does It Better sold over one million copies worldwide.

In July 2000 they toured Canada as part of YTV's PsychoBlast Tour, supporting Christina Aguilera and also headlining the Canadian tour in 2001. In Fall of 2000 they toured along with Destiny's Child, as support act for Christina Aguilera's "Genie in a Bottle Tour" throughout North America. They were the support act for NSYNC on the Eastern North America dates of Leg 2 of the "No Strings Attached Tour" in 2000.

Discography

Studio albums

Singles

Notes

References

 
Canadian boy bands
Canadian pop music groups
Musical groups from Vancouver
Musical groups established in 1993
Musical groups disestablished in 2005
1993 establishments in British Columbia
2005 disestablishments in British Columbia